Southgate Methodist Church is a Methodist church in The Bourne, Southgate, north London. The church was built in 1929, replacing a building on Chase Side.

References

External links 

Churches in the London Borough of Enfield
Southgate, London
Methodist churches in London